Dothiorella longicollis is an endophytic fungus that might be a canker pathogen, specifically for Adansonia gibbosa (baobab). It was isolated from said trees, as well as surrounding ones, in the Kimberley (Western Australia).

References

Further reading
Sakalidis, Monique L., Giles E. StJ Hardy, and Treena I. Burgess. "Endophytes as potential pathogens of the baobab species Adansonia gregorii: a focus on the Botryosphaeriaceae." Fungal Ecology 4.1 (2011): 1–14.
Jami, Fahimeh, et al. "Five new species of the Botryosphaeriaceae from Acacia karroo in South Africa." Cryptogamie, Mycologie 33.3 (2012): 245–266.
Australia, Western. Draginja Pavlic. Diss. University of Pretoria, 2009.

External links
MycoBank

longicollis
Fungi described in 2008